Thomas Lück (born 29 January 1981) is a German sprint canoer who has competed since 1998.

A junior world champion from 1998 (C-2 1000 m with Stefan Holtz), Lück won three medals at the 2004 European Under-23 Championships in Poznań, including the C-2 1000 m gold with Stephan Breuing.

He has five medals at the ICF Canoe Sprint World Championships with a gold (C-4 1000 m: 2006), three silvers (C-4 500 m: 2007, C-4 1000 m: 2007, 2009), and a bronze (C-4 1000 m: 2005).

Lück, who now lives in Rostock, is a member of the SC Neubrandenburg club.

References
Canoe09.ca profile 

1981 births
Living people
People from East Berlin
Canoeists from Berlin
German male canoeists
ICF Canoe Sprint World Championships medalists in Canadian